, Spanish for 'The Peak' or 'The Summit' (in plural form), may refer to:

Places
 La Cumbre (Galápagos Islands), a volcano
 La Cumbre, Cáceres, a municipality in Extremadura, Spain
 La Cumbre, Córdoba, a small town in Argentina
 La Cumbre Airport (codes LCM, SACC), a municipal airport in Córdoba, Argentina
 La Cumbre, Valle del Cauca, a city in Colombia
 La Cumbre Pass, another name of Uspallata Pass  Bermejo Pass, a mountain pass in the Andes that connects Santiago and Los Andes, Chile, with Mendoza, Argentina
 La Cumbre Peak, a mountain in California, US
 La Cumbre Plaza, an outdoor shopping center in Santa Barbara, California, US

See also
 Cumbre (disambiguation) (also covers cumbres)
 En la Cumbre, album by Rigo Tovar and Costa Azul
 MV La Cumbre (originally MV Empire MacDermott), a British cargo ship